The  Zănicel is a left tributary of the river Crasna in Romania. It flows into the Crasna in Bobota.

References

Rivers of Romania
Rivers of Sălaj County